Glacial erratic boulders of King County are large glacial erratic boulders of rock which were moved into King County, Washington by glacial action during previous ice ages.

The Pleistocene ice age glaciation of Puget Sound created many of the geographical features of the region, including Puget Sound itself, and the erratics are one of the remnants of that age. According to Nick Zentner of Central Washington University Department of Geological Sciences, "Canadian rocks [are] strewn all over the Puget lowland, stretching from the Olympic Peninsula clear over to the Cascade Range." The soil of Seattle, the county's (and state's) largest city, is approximately 80% glacial drift, most of which is Vashon glacial deposits (till), and nearly all of the city's major named hills are characterized as drumlins (Beacon Hill, First Hill, Capitol Hill, Queen Anne Hill) or drift uplands (Magnolia, West Seattle). Boulders greater than 3 meters in diameter are "rare" in the Vashon till, but can be found, as seen in the table below.

List of boulders

References
Notes

Sources

.

Further reading

External links

Washington glacial erratics project at University of Washington dept. of earth and space sciences

Landforms of King County, Washington
 King County